Jauch is a common German surname, which may refer to

General

 The Jauch family, an important family in German and Hanseatic history

People named Jauch

Erin Jauch, American trampolining gymnast
Günther Jauch, German television host
Heinrich Jauch, state attorney in the Third Reich
Joachim Daniel von Jauch, German Baroque architect
Josef-Maria Jauch, Swiss physicist
Ray Jauch, American football coach
Robert Jauch, American state legislator from Wisconsin

German-language surnames